Hickory Creek is a stream in Butler County in the U.S. state of Missouri. It is a tributary of the Black River.

Hickory Creek was named for the black hickory timber in the area.

See also
List of rivers of Missouri

References

Rivers of Butler County, Missouri
Rivers of Missouri
Tributaries of the Black River (Arkansas–Missouri)